In professional wrestling, the term Black Saturday refers to Saturday, July 14, 1984, the day when Vince McMahon's World Wrestling Federation (WWF) took over the time slot on Superstation WTBS that had been home to Georgia Championship Wrestling (GCW) and its flagship weekly program, World Championship Wrestling, for 12 years. McMahon's purchase led to a longstanding rivalry between himself and WTBS owner Ted Turner, who later bought GCW's successor Jim Crockett Promotions (JCP) and formed his own company under the World Championship Wrestling (WCW) name.

Background
Georgia Championship Wrestling's first weekly television series had premiered on then-WTCG in 1972 when station owner Ted Turner purchased the rights to air the program from station WQXI. From that date, GCW's program aired for two hours (from 6-8 PM and later from 6:05 to 8:05 following the introduction of TBS' "Turner Time" in 1981) every Saturday night. In 1976, GCW became the first National Wrestling Alliance (NWA) territory to earn a national cable television contract as the soon-to-be-renamed Superstation WTBS began to be carried by various cable and satellite providers nationwide.

In 1982, Georgia Championship Wrestling renamed its weekly program World Championship Wrestling, a name the entire promotion would grow to be identified by. Jack Brisco and Gerald Brisco had major stakes in the organization while Ole Anderson was head booker and was basically in charge of operations. GCW's program was hosted by NWA announcer Gordon Solie, who also hosted programs for various other NWA affiliated promotions at the time (such as Championship Wrestling from Florida). World Championship Wrestling was a program featuring the "rasslin'" style of wrestling, that emphasized a more athletic product and put less emphasis on cartoonish gimmicks.

In 1983, WWF owner Vince McMahon, who promoted the cartoonish gimmicks that GCW fans were not traditionally supportive of and who in recent months had begun to expand his promotion nationwide, took control of the other major cable television contract at the time when he purchased Southwest Championship Wrestling's Sunday morning USA Network time slot for his All American Wrestling program. The following year, in addition to the cable contract and his nationally syndicated offerings (WWF Championship Wrestling and WWF All-Star Wrestling), McMahon expanded further by premiering Tuesday Night Titans on USA.

Later in 1984, McMahon decided that, as part of his continued expansion, the WWF needed a second national cable outlet for its weekly programming. The only other national cable deal available at the moment was the one GCW had with WTBS; if McMahon was able to acquire this time slot, he would control all nationally televised professional wrestling in the United States. Consequently, he approached Turner with an offer to buy the Saturday night GCW time slot, only for Turner to reject him out of hand. McMahon, undeterred, tried to find another way of securing the slot for the WWF; he discovered that method shortly after his rejection by Turner.

While GCW's programming had a loyal fan base and was fairly popular, things were not as great for the promotion behind the scenes. The source of the problem was Ole Anderson, who had begun to alienate his fellow owners with his booking and operation of the company. Seeing this turmoil, McMahon approached the Brisco brothers and Jim Barnett, the fourth owner of the company, and discussed a potential sale. All three men agreed to sell their stakes in GCW to McMahon, giving the WWF the controlling stake in GCW and McMahon access to the Saturday night time slot. The last World Championship Wrestling program under GCW control aired on July 7, 1984.

Slot takeover and reception

The July 14 program opened with show co-host Freddie Miller (Gordon Solie was absent for reasons never made clear; he either resigned in protest or was terminated following the purchase, as were many other people involved with the production) introducing McMahon and welcoming the WWF to TBS. McMahon promised the GCW fans who were tuned in that they would enjoy his new program just as much.

However, unlike World Championship Wrestling, which had been a weekly show from the TBS studios in Atlanta, the WWF's TBS show at first consisted solely of highlights from the WWF's USA Network and syndicated programming, as well as house show clips from Madison Square Garden, Boston Garden, and most of the other major arenas it did business in. This was in direct violation of a promise McMahon had made at the time of the purchase to provide original programming for TBS, including having shows taped at the TBS studios. Finally, on March 2, 1985, the WWF began airing in-studio matches (while changing the name of the program to WWF Georgia Championship Wrestling) co-hosted by ring announcer Miller and play-by-play commentator Gorilla Monsoon.  Along with these matches, Miller did interviews with many of the WWF stars, mainly to promote the first WrestleMania card.  These programs ran until March 30, 1985, using the same set that would later be used by Jim Crockett when he purchased the WWF time slot from McMahon (see below).

The WWF show on TBS was a ratings disaster from the start. GCW's core audience began writing and calling TBS in droves, furious over the fact that GCW was no longer airing on the station and demanding to know why. Thousands of complaints were received, many of which focused on the loss of Gordon Solie. Turner himself was angered by the sinking ratings and made two decisions that would fix the ratings problem.

First, Turner made an offer to Bill Watts, a promoter who ran Mid South Wrestling out of Oklahoma, to take a Sunday afternoon time slot on TBS. He also entered into negotiations to bring Championship Wrestling from Georgia, an NWA affiliate founded by Ole Anderson after his ouster by McMahon and which the NWA regarded as the successor to GCW, to the station on Saturday mornings with Gordon Solie as announcer. McMahon was not happy with either of Turner's decisions, thinking his control of GCW would make the WWF the exclusive wrestling company on TBS. Both Mid South Wrestling and Championship Wrestling from Georgia outdid the WWF in ratings.

Sale and aftermath
Losing money on the deal and desperately looking for help, McMahon turned to Jim Barnett, who directed him to NWA President Jim Crockett Jr., the owner of Jim Crockett Promotions (JCP), which promoted wrestling shows in Virginia, North Carolina, and South Carolina. At the time, Crockett was trying to counter the WWF's national expansion by unifying the remaining NWA territories that McMahon had not driven out of business into one nationwide unit. Crockett, who had just bought out Championship Wrestling from Georgia, bought the World Championship Wrestling program from McMahon for $1 million and returned NWA programming to TBS. This promotion would eventually become World Championship Wrestling (WCW) when Turner bought the promotion from Crockett in 1988 and later withdrew it from the NWA.

Despite his setback with regard to the TBS time slot, McMahon's USA Network contract and syndicated programming were not affected in any way. USA gave McMahon another time slot when WWF Prime Time Wrestling, a similar program to the WWF's TBS program that aired on Monday nights and was a forerunner to the current Monday Night Raw, debuted early in 1985. Due in large part to both parties' actions, McMahon and Turner began a rivalry that would continue for over a decade, before ending in 2001 when McMahon purchased the non-license assets of WCW from AOL Time Warner, which had previously purchased Turner's wrestling assets (along with the rest of his company) in 1996.

Turner's decision to give time slots to Bill Watts and Ole Anderson indirectly led to other wrestling organizations gaining national cable television contracts. Verne Gagne's AWA debuted on ESPN in 1985 and aired on the network until the company folded in 1991. Fritz Von Erich's World Class Championship Wrestling (WCCW) joined ESPN in 1986 and its Dallas-based successors, the United States Wrestling Association (USWA) and the Global Wrestling Federation (GWF), later occupied time slots on the network as well. Herb Abrams' UWF had a weekly program that aired on SportsChannel America. By 1994, none of these companies remained in business, with the exception of the Memphis-based branch of the USWA, which folded in 1997. During the 1990s, Philadelphia-based Extreme Championship Wrestling (ECW) rose to become the third-largest wrestling company in North America, behind the WWF and WCW. In 1999, it secured a cable deal to air a show on TNN, but the next year, TNN gained rights to WWF programming and dropped ECW, which folded in April 2001, shortly after the WWF's purchase of WCW's assets.

In July 2018, the Black Saturday episode was made available as a hidden gem on the WWE Network.

References

1984 in professional wrestling
1984 in American television
July 1984 events in the United States
Jim Crockett Promotions
TBS (American TV channel) original programming
World Championship Wrestling
World Championship Wrestling shows
History of WWE
Mass media-related controversies in the United States
Professional wrestling controversies